A One-Act Play Festival is a festival of one-act plays, often in a competitive format. Plays are usually presented over a weekend, week or longer period. If the festival includes a competition, plays are normally judged by an independent adjudicator, such as a member of GODA.

In the UK there are two main organisations operating festivals

All England Theatre Festival (AETF)
This is a knock-out competition covering several regional rounds and resulting in an "All England" final

National Drama Festivals Association (NDFA)
Each festival is distinct but at the end of the year the adjudicators select the best plays to enter a "British All Winners" competition.

For a recently published study of the one-act play, see Stephen Murray, Taking Our Amusements Seriously. LAP, 2010. .

Theatre festivals in England